The Bigadiç mine is a large boron ore mine located at Balıkesir Province in western Turkey. Bigadiç represents one of the largest boron reserves in Turkey, with an estimated reserve of 623.5 million tonnes of ore grading 30% boron.

References 

Boron mines in Turkey
Balıkesir Province
Bigadiç